The List of abbeys and priories in the United Kingdom is organised by country:

 Abbeys and priories in England
 Abbeys and priories in Northern Ireland
 List of religious houses in Scotland
 Abbeys and priories in Wales

See also
 Abbeys and priories on the Isle of Man